Club Deportivo Litoral may refer to:

Club Deportivo Litoral (Cochabamba)
Club Deportivo Litoral (La Paz)